IV Brigade, Royal Horse Artillery (Territorial Force), along with its sister III Brigade, Royal Horse Artillery (T.F.), was a Royal Horse Artillery brigade of the Territorial Force that was formed in Egypt in April 1916 for the ANZAC Mounted Division.

Both brigades served with the ANZAC Mounted Division during the Sinai and Palestine Campaign of World War I.  In July 1917, the division's artillery was reorganized and the brigade headquarters were dissolved.

History

Formation
The ANZAC Mounted Division was formed in March 1916 with four cavalry brigades, each of three regiments: the Australian 1st, 2nd and 3rd Light Horse Brigades and the New Zealand Mounted Rifles Brigade.  Four British Territorial Force horse artillery batteries were assigned to the division to provide artillery support, one per brigade.

IV Brigade, Royal Horse Artillery (Territorial Force) was formed in April 1916 in the Egyptian Expeditionary Force with
Ayrshire Battery, RHA (T.F.)
Inverness-shire Battery, RHA (T.F.)
The batteries had been assigned to the Lowland and Highland Mounted Brigades, respectively, at the outbreak of the war, each equipped with four Ehrhardt 15-pounder guns.  The batteries had arrived in Egypt independently; Inverness-shire RHA landed at Alexandria between 22 and 25 February 1916.

In practice, the batteries were permanently attached to the mounted brigades: Inverness-shire RHA to the 3rd Light Horse Brigade and Ayrshire RHA to the New Zealand Mounted Rifles Brigade. When the 3rd Light Horse Brigade was transferred to the Imperial Mounted Division in January 1917, it was replaced by the British 22nd Mounted Brigade.  Inverness-shire RHA remained with the ANZAC Mounted Division and was attached to 22nd Mounted Brigade thereafter.

Active service

The brigade, and its batteries, served with the ANZAC Mounted Division in the Sinai and Palestine Campaign until July 1917.  With the division, it saw action at the Battle of Romani (414 August 1916) as part of No. 3 Section, Suez Canal Defences.  This saw the repulse of the final Turkish attempt to cut the Suez Canal.

The division then joined the Desert Column and with it took part in the advance across the Sinai.  It fought at the Battle of Magdhaba (23 December 1916) and the Battle of Rafah (9 January 1917).  The batteries were then re-equipped with four 18 pounders each.  They then took part in the First (2627 March 1917) and Second Battles of Gaza (1719 April 1917).

Reorganised
In July 1917, the artillery of the ANZAC Mounted Division was reorganized.  A new headquarters, XVIII Brigade, Royal Horse Artillery (T.F.), was formed for the division and took command of Inverness-shire and Ayrshire RHA.  They were joined by Somerset RHA of III Brigade, RHA (T.F.).  With the departure of its batteries, IV Brigade was dissolved.

See also

Notes

References

Bibliography

External links
The Royal Horse Artillery on The Long, Long Trail
The Great War Royal Horse Artillery

Royal Horse Artillery brigades
Artillery units and formations of World War I
Military units and formations established in 1916
Military units and formations disestablished in 1917